Ionel Radu (born 24 December 1969) is a Romanian handball player. He competed in the men's tournament at the 1992 Summer Olympics.

References

1969 births
Living people
Romanian male handball players
Olympic handball players of Romania
Handball players at the 1992 Summer Olympics
Place of birth missing (living people)